Hidden Away may refer to:

 "Hidden Away" (song), 2010 song by Josh Groban
 Hidden Away (2014 film), 2014 Spanish film
 Hidden Away (2020 film), 2020 Italian film